The 1952 Colorado State Bears baseball team represented Colorado State College of Education in the 1952 NCAA baseball season. The Bears played their home games at Jackson Field. The team was coached by Pete Butler in his 10th year at Colorado State.

The Bears won the District VII playoff to advance to the College World Series, where they were defeated by the Western Michigan Broncos.

Roster

Schedule 

! style="" | Regular Season
|- valign="top" 

|- align="center" bgcolor="#ccffcc"
| 1 ||  ||  || Jackson Field • Greeley, Colorado || 17–6 || 1–0 || 1–0
|- align="center" bgcolor="#ccffcc"
| 2 ||  || Colorado Mines || Jackson Field • Greeley, Colorado || 12–6 || 2–0 || 2–0
|- align="center" bgcolor="#ffcccc"
| 3 ||  || vs Lowry Air Force Base || Unknown • Unknown, Colorado || 4–7 || 2–1 || 2–0
|- align="center" bgcolor="#ccffcc"
| 4 ||  || vs Lowry Air Force Base || Unknown • Unknown, Colorado || 25–7 || 3–1 || 2–0
|- align="center" bgcolor="#ffcccc"
| 5 ||  || vs  || Unknown • Unknown || 4–6 || 3–2 || 2–0
|- align="center" bgcolor="#ffcccc"
| 6 ||  || vs Wyoming || Unknown • Unknown || 4–9 || 3–3 || 2–0
|- align="center" bgcolor="#ccffcc"
| 7 ||  || vs  || Unknown • Unknown || 8–7 || 4–3 || 2–0
|- align="center" bgcolor="#ffcccc"
| 8 ||  || vs  || Unknown • Unknown || 2–6 || 4–4 || 2–1
|- align="center" bgcolor="#ccffcc"
| 9 ||  || vs Colorado College || Unknown • Unknown || 13–11 || 5–4 || 3–1
|- align="center" bgcolor="#ccffcc"
| 10 ||  || vs  || Unknown • Unknown || 6–5 || 6–4 || 3–1
|- align="center" bgcolor="#ccffcc"
| 11 ||  || vs Colorado Mines || Unknown • Unknown || 23–2 || 7–4 || 4–1
|- align="center" bgcolor="#ccffcc"
| 12 ||  || vs Colorado Mines || Unknown • Unknown || 10–2 || 8–4 || 5–1
|- align="center" bgcolor="#ffcccc"
| 13 ||  || vs Colorado A&M || Unknown • Unknown || 5–15 || 8–5 || 5–1
|- align="center" bgcolor="#ccffcc"
| 14 ||  ||  || Jackson Field • Greeley, Colorado || 10–3 || 9–5 || 6–1
|- align="center" bgcolor="#ccffcc"
| 15 ||  || Western State || Jackson Field • Greeley, Colorado || 14–5 || 10–5 || 7–1
|- align="center" bgcolor="#ffcccc"
| 16 ||  || vs Denver || Unknown • Unknown || 3–4 || 10–6 || 7–1
|- align="center" bgcolor="#ccffcc"
| 17 ||  || vs Colorado College || Unknown • Unknown || 6–0 || 11–6 || 8–1
|- align="center" bgcolor="#ccffcc"
| 18 ||  || vs Colorado College || Unknown • Unknown || 1–0 || 12–6 || 9–1
|- align="center" bgcolor="#ffcccc"
| 19 ||  || vs Lowry Air Force Base || Unknown • Unknown || 8–10 || 12–7 || 9–1
|- align="center" bgcolor="#ccffcc"
| 20 ||  || vs Lowry Air Force Base || Unknown • Unknown || 7–6 || 13–7 || 9–1
|-

|-
|-
! style="" | Postseason
|- valign="top"

|- align="center" bgcolor="#ccffcc"
| 21 || May 30 ||  || Jackson Field • Greeley, Colorado || 7–6 || 14–7 || 9–1
|- align="center" bgcolor="#ccffcc"
| 22 || May 31 || BYU || Jackson Field • Greeley, Colorado || 11–6 || 15–7 || 9–1
|-

|- align="center" bgcolor="#ffcccc"
| 23 || June 12 || vs Missouri || Omaha Municipal Stadium • Omaha, Nebraska || 1–15 || 15–8 || 9–1
|- align="center" bgcolor="#ffcccc"
| 24 || June 13 || vs Western Michigan || Omaha Municipal Stadium • Omaha, Nebraska || 6–8 || 15–9 || 9–1
|-

Awards and honors 
Bob Distifano
 All-Rocky Mountain Conference Team

Jim DiTollo
 All-Rocky Mountain Conference Team

Bob Stewart
 All-Rocky Mountain Conference Team

Cyril Trofholz
 All-Rocky Mountain Conference Team

References 

Northern Colorado Bears baseball seasons
Colorado State Bears baseball
College World Series seasons
Colorado State
Rocky Mountain Athletic Conference baseball champion seasons